Seacrest and Seacrest Beach are communities located along County Road 30A in the Florida Panhandle. They are located at the eastern end of scenic highway 30A. Following the development of adjacent Alys Beach, the Seacrest Beach community is split into two geographic areas. The eastern side of Seacrest Beach borders Rosemary Beach and the western side borders WaterSound Beach. Recreational opportunities at the beach community include fishing, kayaking, swimming, golfing, and beachgoing. The nearby coastal dune lake, Camp Creek, offers hiking and bird watching.

See also
South Walton

References

Unincorporated communities in Florida
Unincorporated communities in Walton County, Florida